The 1983 NBA draft took place on June 28, 1983, in New York City. A total of 226 players were selected over 10 rounds by the league's 23 teams.

The first overall pick of this draft was 7’4” center Ralph Sampson, predicted as an NBA superstar since high school.   The three-time College Player of the Year had spent all four years of his college career at the University of Virginia,  and was taken first by the Houston Rockets.   Displaying his graceful above-the-rim game and ability to run the court like a guard, he got off to a certain Hall of Fame bound start as an  NBA All-Star and NBA Rookie of the Year before injuries several seasons in derailed his career.

Sampson was joined in the Hall by  University of Houston Cougars standout Clyde “The Glide” Drexler, taken number 14 by the Portland Trail Blazers.
Despite there being only 23 teams at the time of the draft, the Cleveland Cavaliers were awarded the 24th pick out of courtesy. Then-owner Ted Stepien was infamous for repeatedly trading first-round picks in the late 1970s and early 1980s, which, considering Cleveland's morose records in that time period, eventually culminated in the NBA creating a rule banning teams from dealing all of their first-round picks in consecutive years.

Four players from the 1983 draft later served or now serve as coaches—Doc Rivers for the Philadelphia 76ers, Randy Wittman for the Washington Wizards, Byron Scott for the Los Angeles Lakers from 2014 to 2016, and point guard of the 1983 NCAA championship North Carolina State Wolfpack Sidney Lowe.

While Scott won the Coach of the Year award in 2008, Rivers won an NBA Championship with the Celtics in that same year.

7’7” Manute Bol was selected in the 5th round by the Clippers, but the NBA rejected the pick on technicalities. Manute had never filed draft paperwork, and his passport listed him at 19 (at the time, 19 years was too young to be drafted).

Florida State star Mitchell Wiggins, father of future No. 1 overall draft pick Andrew Wiggins, was drafted 23rd by the Indiana Pacers.

Draft

 
 

*Compensation for draft choices previously traded away by Ted Stepien.

Notable post-second round picks
These picks have played at least one game in the NBA but were not selected in the first or second rounds.

Early entrants

College underclassmen
The following college basketball players successfully applied for early draft entrance.

  Russell Cross – F, Purdue (junior)
  Clyde Drexler – G/F, Houston (junior)
  Derek Harper – G, Illinois (junior)
  Doc Rivers – G, Marquette (junior)
  Byron Scott – G, Arizona State (junior)
  Ennis Whatley – G, Alabama (sophomore)

See also
 List of first overall NBA draft picks

References
General

Specific

External links
NBA.com
NBA.com: NBA Draft History

Draft
National Basketball Association draft
NBA draft
NBA draft
1980s in Manhattan
Basketball in New York City
Sporting events in New York City
Sports in Manhattan
Madison Square Garden